Buckler's Hard is a hamlet on the banks of the Beaulieu River in the English county of Hampshire. With its Georgian cottages running down to the river, Buckler's Hard is part of the  Beaulieu Estate.

History 
Buckler's Hard, originally called Montagu Town, was built by the second Duke of Montagu, and was intended to be a free port for trade with the West Indies. Its geography also favoured the development of shipbuilding, as the hamlet possessed access to a sheltered but navigable waterway with gravel banks capable of supporting slipways for vessel construction and launch. Timber for hulls was also readily available from the surrounding New Forest.

Shipbuilding at Buckler's Hard commenced in the early eighteenth century. A private shipyard adjoining the hamlet was established by James Wyatt, a local entrepreneur and timber merchant from Hythe on Southampton Water. Wyatt & Co. won a contract to build the Navy ship  in 1744, and subsequently another, at Buckler's Hard. Henry Adams, a master shipwright, was sent from Deptford Dockyard to Buckler's Hard in 1744 by the Admiralty to oversee the building of these ships by Wyatt & Co. After the completion of the initial ships by Wyatt, Buckler's Hard grew to national prominence under Henry Adams and won subsequent Royal Navy contracts. The two main shipbuilders associated with the shipyard are Henry Adams and from 1783 his son Balthazar Adams.

Shipbuilding at Buckler's Hard declined in the nineteenth century. During World War II, the village was used to build motor torpedo boats, and the river was a base for hundreds of landing craft for the Normandy invasion, Operation Overlord. Today the hamlet is given over to tourism, with a small maritime museum and a modern yachting marina. Buckler's Hard was where Sir Francis Chichester began and finished his solo voyage around the world in the Gipsy Moth IV.

See also
 Hard (nautical)

References

Bibliography

External links

 

Villages in Hampshire
Tourist attractions in Hampshire
Museums in Hampshire
Maritime museums in England
Open-air museums in England